The United Nations Security Council established the Peacekeeping Force for Mali effective 1 July, unanimously adopting resolution 2100 (2013) with the aim too support the political transition process and help stabilize Mali.

United Nations Security Council resolution 2100 was adopted in 2013.

See also
 List of United Nations Security Council Resolutions 2101 to 2200 (2013–2015)

References

External links
Text of the Resolution at undocs.org

2013 United Nations Security Council resolutions
April 2013 events